Ayam bumbu rujak is a typical Indonesian Javanese food made from chicken meat which is still young and uses a red basic spice then grilled. A red base is a spice made from salt, garlic, onion, and red chili. Called seasoning rujak because there are many spices besides chili, including brown sugar which is commonly used in fruit rojak sauce. Ayam bumbu rujak often called ayam bakar bumbu rujak since it is grilled (Indonesian: bakar), thus often regarded as one variant of various ayam bakar recipes.

Actually, rujak seasoning is not only combined with chicken, but can also mix it with grilled fish, grilled duck, and others. Ayam bumbu rujak is from East Java, then its popularity has grown to various regions in Indonesia and is a favorite food of several people and circles. Rujak seasonings that are processed, become spicy, savoury and sweet taste produce a unique taste in chicken dishes.

See also

 Ayam kecap
 Ayam taliwang
 Ayam bakar
 Ayam goreng

References

Javanese cuisine

Indonesian chicken dishes